Adams Township is one of twenty townships in Allen County, Indiana, United States. As of the 2010 census, its population was 31,816.

Geography

Cities and towns
 Fort Wayne (southeast portion)
 New Haven (majority of city)

Unincorporated towns
 Eastland Gardens at 
 River Haven at 
 Sunnymede Woods at 
 Tanglewood at

Neighborhoods
 Anthony Wayne Village at 
 Fairfax at 
 Meadowbrook at 
(This list is based on USGS data and may include former settlements.)

Adjacent townships
 St. Joseph Township (north)
 Milan Township (northeast)
 Jefferson Township (east)
 Madison Township (southeast)
 Marion Township (south)
 Pleasant Township (southwest)
 Wayne Township (west)

Major highways

Cemeteries
The township contains these two cemeteries: Concordia Gardens and Saint John.

School districts
 East Allen County Schools

Political districts
 Indiana's 3rd congressional district
 State House District 79
 State House District 80
 State House District 81
 State House District 84
 State House District 85
 State Senate District 14
 State Senate District 15

References
 
 United States Census Bureau 2008 TIGER/Line Shapefiles
 IndianaMap

External links

Townships in Allen County, Indiana
Fort Wayne, IN Metropolitan Statistical Area
Townships in Indiana